Birgit Pohl (22 April 1954 – 21 June 2022)  was a German Paralympian athlete competing mainly in throwing events.

Career
She competed in her first Paralympics in 1996 in Atlanta, United States, where she won a gold medal in the F32–33 shot put.  She returned to the 2000 Summer Paralympics in Sydney, Australia where she won a gold in the F33–34 discus throw.

After an unsuccessful 2004 games in Athens, Greece, failing to win a medal in any of her three events, discus, shot or javelin, she competed in the 2008 Summer Paralympics in Beijing, China. There she won a silver medal in the women's F32–34/52–53 shot put event and a bronze in the T33/34/52/53 javelin throw.

Pohl announced her retirement from sports in 2012. She died on 21 June 2022 at the age of 68.

References

External links
 

1954 births
2022 deaths
Paralympic athletes of Germany
Athletes (track and field) at the 1996 Summer Paralympics
Athletes (track and field) at the 2000 Summer Paralympics
Athletes (track and field) at the 2004 Summer Paralympics
Athletes (track and field) at the 2008 Summer Paralympics
Paralympic gold medalists for Germany
Paralympic silver medalists for Germany
Paralympic bronze medalists for Germany
Medalists at the 1996 Summer Paralympics
Medalists at the 2000 Summer Paralympics
Medalists at the 2008 Summer Paralympics
Paralympic medalists in athletics (track and field)
German female discus throwers
German female javelin throwers
German female shot putters
People from Neustadt an der Orla